William John Jewell (1 January 1855 – 3 March 1927) was an English first-class cricketer who made one appearance for Somerset County Cricket Club in 1884. He opened the batting for Somerset in both innings of their match against Kent, scoring nine runs in the first innings and one run in the second. He also bowled twelve overs without taking a wicket. Somerset lost the match by an innings and 27 runs. Jewell also played an earlier match for Somerset, in 1880, before they had been granted first-class status. In this match, played against Sussex, Jewell was a tail-end batsman, and claimed four wickets in Sussex's first innings.

References

1855 births
1927 deaths
English cricketers
Somerset cricketers
Sportspeople from Cornwall
People from Wendron